The Rights of Minorities in the Islamic State is a book written by Sayyid Abul Ala Maududi, published in Lahore, Pakistan in 1954.

In it Maududi references the millet system and its organization along communal lines as a possible way the Islamic state would deal with minority rights according to the sharia concept of dhimma.

References 

1954 non-fiction books
Books by Sayyid Abul Ala Maududi
Minorities